Selly Galley, born 25 September 1987 as Selorm Galley-Fiawoo is a Ghanaian actress and TV presenter. She was on Big Brother Africa (season 8).

Personal life 
She is married to Praye Tietia, a Ghanaian hip hop star.

References 

1987 births
Ghanaian actresses
Ghanaian television presenters
Ghanaian women television presenters
Living people